Leucania joannisi is a species of moth of the family Noctuidae. It is found in tropical and subtropical Africa, Morocco, Portugal, Spain, southern Italy, Greece, Israel and Saudi Arabia.

Adults are on wing from April to October. There are two generations per year.

External links
Hadeninae of Israel
Lepiforum.de

Leucania
Moths of Europe
Moths of the Middle East
Moths described in 1952